The following is a list of the nine sovereign states and one territory where Portuguese is an official language.

Nations with Portuguese as an official language

Sovereign states 

 (see Brazilian Portuguese)

 (co-official with Tetum. 51,800 L1 speakers since 2007)
 (co-official with Spanish, and French)

Territory

Sortable list

Spread of Portuguese
During a period of Portuguese discoveries and through a large colonial empire, the language was spread to areas in Africa, Asia and the Americas, beyond Macau and East Timor in the Pacific Ocean. Portuguese-based creole languages also developed during this era.

Today, Portuguese continues to thrive outside the Lusophone world through the presence of large expat communities of Brazilians, Portuguese, Cape Verdeans, Angolans and Timorese found throughout the world.

Europe

Portugal
Portuguese is spoken as a first language in Portugal (the language's namesake) by nearly all of the nation's 10.6 million people. The ancestor of modern Portuguese, Galician-Portuguese, began developing in the northwest of the Iberian Peninsula, in an area encompassing present-day northern-Portugal and Galicia, at around the 9th century. Modern Portuguese started developing in the early 16th century.

Rest of Europe
The Galician language, spoken natively in Galicia, Spain, is a dialect of Portuguese, according to many linguists, which makes northwestern Spain a lusophone region.
Portuguese-speaking immigrants from Portugal, Brazil, Portuguese-speaking Africa and Macau have also settled in Andorra (around 15 000 speakers), Belgium, France (around 500 000 speakers), Germany, Luxembourg, Spain, Switzerland, and the United Kingdom. In Luxembourg, 19% of the population speaks Portuguese as mother tongue, making it the largest minority language by percentage in a Western European country.

Africa

Angola
Portuguese is the sole official language of Angola, and 85% of the population profess fluency in the language. Additionally, 75% of Angolan households speak Portuguese as their primary language, and native Bantu languages have been influenced by Portuguese through loanwords.

Mozambique
Portuguese is the sole official language of Mozambique and serves as a lingua franca between the various ethnic groups in the country. Slightly over 30% of the population are native speakers of Portuguese, while 65% profess fluency. Most of Mozambican media is available solely in Portuguese, and the country receives several Portuguese and Brazilian television stations.

Guinea-Bissau
Despite being the sole official language, only 50% of the population professes fluency in Portuguese. However, a Portuguese-based creole called Guinea-Bissau Creole (Kriol) is spoken by nearly the whole population.

Cape Verde
Similar to Guinea-Bissau, although Portuguese is the only official language, a Portuguese-based creole known as Cape Verdean Creole is spoken by the majority of the population. Most Cape Verdeans are fluent in Portuguese as well. Education and media are available largely in standard European Portuguese only.

São Tomé and Príncipe
In São Tomé and Príncipe, Portuguese is by far the most spoken language, with around 95% of the population speaking it at home or professing fluency; 99.8% declared speaking Portuguese in the 1991 census. A Portuguese-based creole called Forro is also spoken.

Equatorial Guinea
Equatorial Guinea was a Spanish colony between 1778 and 1968 and was originally a group of Portuguese colonies between 1474 and 1778. A Portuguese creole is spoken by locals on the island of Annobón.

In 2007, President Teodoro Obiang Nguema announced a decision to make Portuguese the third official language of the country after Spanish and French. This was in an effort by the government to improve its communications, trade, and bilateral relations with Portuguese-speaking countries. Despite government promotions, Portuguese remains rarely spoken in Equatorial Guinea, but increased political and trade relations with Portuguese-speaking nations (i.e. Brazil, Angola, Portugal) will soon increase the number of Portuguese speakers in the country. News, sports, and entertainment media in Portuguese will undoubtedly also facilitate increased comprehension. The majority of the population (~90%) still speaks Spanish as their primary language, and Spanish is still the administrative language and that of education, while French is the second official language.

Rest of Africa
Large Portuguese-speaking communities are found in Namibia, South Africa, and Zambia due to immigration from the Lusophone African countries. Portuguese is also  taught in the schools of these countries.

Americas

Brazil
With a population of over 212 million, Brazil is by far the world's largest Portuguese-speaking nation and the only one in the Americas. Portuguese was introduced during the Portuguese colonial period. Portuguese has also served as a lingua franca between the various ethnic groups in Brazil and the native Amerindian population after the Jesuits were expelled from every Portuguese territory and the languages associated with them prohibited.

Portuguese is the first language of the overwhelming majority of Brazilians, at 99.5%.

The form of Portuguese spoken in South America is somewhat different from that spoken in Europe, with differences in vocabulary and grammar that can be compared to the differences between American and British English, but with somewhat different phonology and prosody from the remaining Portuguese-speaking countries. Nevertheless, European and Brazilian Portuguese are completely mutually intelligible. The vast majority of Brazilian characteristics are also found in some rural, remote Portuguese registers (or the African and Asian ones, indicating an Old Portuguese feature lost in Europe), while nearly all distinctive European characteristics can be found in any major dialect of Brazil (such as fluminense, specially its carioca sociolect, and florianopolitano), due to a stronger or more recent Portuguese and other European immigration.

Migration from Brazil also led to a great number of Portuguese speakers in the Southern Cone (especially Uruguay with portunhol da pampa), Paraguay (see brasiguayos), other regions of South America (especially Bolivia) except Venezuela, Japan (see Brazilians in Japan 400,000 and dekasegi, official numbers do not include second generation Portuguese speakers and naturalized citizens), South Korea, the Philippines (see Brazilians in the Philippines), and Israel (see Aliyah from Latin America in the 2000s).

Rest of South America
Although Brazil is the only Portuguese-speaking nation in South America, it has the largest population, area and economy on the continent. Thus, the South American trade bloc Mercosul uses Portuguese alongside Spanish as its working languages. A Spanish influenced Portuguese dialect is spoken in the northern Uruguayan border area with Brazil. Given the proximity and trading relations between Portuguese speaking Brazil, and its respective Spanish speaking nations, Portuguese is offered as a foreign (sometimes obligatory)  language course at most schools in Uruguay, Argentina, Paraguay, Venezuela and Bolivia, and has become the second (after English) most studied foreign language in these countries.

In Venezuela and Guyana, there are communities of Portuguese immigrants (mostly Madeirans) and their descendants who speak Portuguese as their native language.

Given the similarities between Spanish and Portuguese, a colloquial mix of both, unofficially called "Portuñol" or "Portunhol", is spoken by large number of people travelling between Brazil and its Spanish-speaking neighbours. People living in the border areas usually like Paraguay and Uruguay mix the two languages in their daily conversation, a phenomenon similar to Spanglish for Latinos living in the United States.

North America

There are more than 1.5 million Portuguese Americans and about 300,000 Brazilian Americans living in the United States, and Portuguese is spoken by over 730,000 people at home in the country. There are over 500,000 people of Portuguese descent living in Canada; however,  most of the community's population now speaks English or French as their primary language. Portuguese is also a primary language along with English in the British Overseas Territory of Bermuda.

In Mexico, mainly in the states of Quintana Roo, Yucatán, Jalisco, and Mexico City, there are small communities of speakers who are Brazilians. Portuguese, Cape Verdeans, Angolans, and Uruguayans are mainly from the Rivera Department.

Asia and Oceania

East Timor and Indonesia

Portuguese is co-official with Tetum in East Timor and Flores, Indonesia and was introduced during the colonial period. A little under 39% of the population professes fluency in Portuguese, and their number is steadily growing. Meanwhile, on the Indonesian side, it is rare to hear a Portuguese speaker because it lost in competition with the local language after becoming a Dutch  colony in 18th century. The local Tetum language has been heavily influenced by Portuguese through loanwords, and code-switching between the two languages is common.

Macau

Due to the one country, two systems policy of China regarding its special administrative regions, Macau is able to retain Portuguese as an official language alongside Cantonese. Portuguese was first introduced to Macau when Portuguese traders established a permanent settlement there in 1537. Despite being a Portuguese colony for over four centuries, the Portuguese language was never widely spoken in Macau and remained limited to administration and higher education. It was spoken primarily by the Portuguese colonists, Macanese people of mixed ancestry, and elites and middle-class people of pure Chinese blood. As a consequence, when Macau was handed back to China in 1999, Portuguese did not have a strong presence like English had in Hong Kong and continued its decline which began when Macau was still under Portuguese rule. Nevertheless, it was only after Portuguese rule ended that the Portuguese language in Macau began to see an increase in speakers due to China's increased trading relations with Lusophone countries. Currently, there is only one school in Macau where Portuguese is the medium of instruction, the Macau Portuguese School, and Portuguese is also mainly taught in government schools. There has been an increase in the teaching of Portuguese owing to the growing trade links between China and lusophone nations such as Portugal, Brazil, Angola, Mozambique, and East Timor, with 5,000 students learning the language. Today, about 3% of Macau's population speaks Portuguese as a first language and 7% of the population professes fluency. Code-switching between Cantonese and Portuguese are commonly heard. A Portuguese creole called Macanese (Patuá) was spoken by Macanese of mixed ancestry but is near extinction today.

Goa (India)

Portuguese is present in the Indian state of Goa, which was a Portuguese colony until 1961. Although it was the sole official language during Portuguese colonial rule, it is mostly spoken by the elderly and educated populations today and is not an official language. Rather, Goa's official state language is Konkani, which has however picked up some Portuguese vocabulary as a legacy of Portuguese influence. Attempts to make Konkani be written in the Portuguese alphabet and  reintroduce Portuguese as a co-official language of Goa have been made in recent years; presently Portuguese is officially taught there.

Portuguese rule in Daman and Diu has also left a smaller Portuguese influence on the territory. A Portuguese-based creole called Língua da Casa is spoken in the territory. As a result of the renewed interest in the Portuguese language and culture, the Portuguese language is making an impressive comeback. Portuguese is still taught in some schools in Goa.

Portuguese people were also present in the area of Vasai , previously Bassein or Bacaim since 1560 until 1739. Though the Portuguese were defeated by Marathas, there are some words which are used by the locals which were borrowed from the Portuguese language. Today there is a large Catholic population, and many churches built during those days are still being used for worship.

Rest of Asia
Portuguese is spoken in Japan among returned immigrants (500,000) or migrant workers from Brazil known as dekasegi. Portuguese loanwords are also present in the Japanese language due to trading relations between Japan and the Portuguese Empire in the 16th century. Portuguese is now part of the curriculum in many Japanese schools, and many radio and television stations are broadcast exclusively in the Portuguese language.

In Malacca, Malaysia, a Portuguese creole known as Papiá Kristang or Cristão is still spoken by some of the Eurasian population.

See also
 Community of Portuguese Language Countries (CPLP)
 Geographical distribution of Portuguese speakers
 List of international organisations which have Portuguese as an official language
 Luso-American
 List of topics on the Portuguese East Indies
 Portuguese dialects
 Portuguese creole
 Portuguese language
 Portuguese-speaking African countries (PALOP)
 Latin America
 Latin Europe
 Romance-speaking Africa
 Glossary of Japanese words of Portuguese origin
 World Portuguese Language Day

References

Community of Portuguese Language Countries